Monica Khanna is an Indian television actress and model. She is known for her playing  Karishma Joglekar in Aasman Se Aage, Payal Deewan in Pyaar Ka Dard Hai Meetha Meetha Pyaara Pyaara and Shraddha Siakal in Thapki Pyar Ki. She is currently a part of StarPlus' show Chikoo Ki Mummy Durr Kei as Rangoli.

Television

Awards and nominations

References

External links

Living people
Indian television actresses
Indian soap opera actresses
Indian voice actresses
Female models from Mumbai
Actresses from Mumbai
Year of birth missing (living people)